Luke Bracey (born 26 April 1989) is an Australian actor.

He is known for his work in films such as Elvis, Monte Carlo, G.I. Joe: Retaliation, The November Man, Point Break, and Hacksaw Ridge; and for television series such as Home and Away, which was his first appearance on screen.

Career
Bracey began his acting career by appearing in the Australian television soap opera series Home and Away. His start came after receiving an invitation to audition; he played the role of Trey Palmer in the series during 2009. He also played Aaron Dean in several episodes of the first season of Dance Academy, broadcast in Australia in 2010. His first big-screen role was in Monte Carlo, shot in Europe in 2010 and released the following year. In 2012, he moved to the USA to further his acting career.

After moving he played Cobra Commander in G.I. Joe: Retaliation (2013), replacing Joseph Gordon-Levitt from the first film. In March 2013, he signed on for the male lead role in the drama pilot Westside, produced by McG and developed by Ilene Chaiken for the American Broadcasting Company; the pilot was not developed into a series. He then had lead roles in the 2014 films The November Man and The Best of Me. In 2015 Bracey starred in Point Break as FBI Agent Johnny Utah, in the remake of the 1991 film.

Filmography

Film

Television

References

External links

1989 births
Living people
21st-century Australian male actors
Australian male film actors
Australian male soap opera actors
Male actors from Sydney
People educated at Scots College (Sydney)